The 1949 Isle of Man Tourist Trophy was the first round of the Grand Prix World Championship that was held in the Isle of Man.

At the FICM (later known as FIM) meeting in London near the end of 1948, it was decided there would be a motorcycle World Championship along Grand Prix lines. It would be a six-race annual series with points being awarded for a placing and a point for the fastest lap of each race. There would be five classes: 500 cc, 350 cc, 250 cc, 125 cc and 600 cc sidecar. The historic Isle of Man TT would be one of those races, and this toughest and most dangerous of Grand Prix motorcycle races would be a mainstay on the GP calendar until 1976.

Harold Daniell, on a Norton, won the 500 cc Senior TT event at an average speed of 86.93 mph. Les Graham, on an AJS Porcupine 500 cc twin, led the Senior race until the last lap when his magneto drive sheared. He pushed the bike past the finish line in tenth place. As he had finished the race he gained one championship point for recording the fastest lap.

Four clubman races were included; the Clubmans Senior, Clubmans Junior, Clubmans Lightweight, and the new Clubmans 1,000 cc.

British 350 cc rider Ben Drinkwater was killed in the Junior TT race at the 11th Milestone.

Race Results

Junior TT (350cc)

Fastest Lap and New Lap Record: Freddie Frith Velocette – 84.23 mph; 26 minutes 52.71 seconds (1 championship point for fastest lap).

Lightweight TT (250cc)

Fastest Lap and New Lap Record: Dickie Dale – Moto Guzzi – 80.43 mph; 28 minutes 8.9 seconds.

1949 Isle of Man Senior TT (500cc)
7 Laps (264.25 Miles) Mountain Course.

Fastest Lap and New Lap Record: Bob Foster Moto Guzzi – 89.75 mph (25 minutes 14 seconds) on lap 2.  Retired lap 5 at Sulby with failed clutch.

Non-championship races

Clubmans 1000 cc classification

Clubmans Senior TT classification

Clubmans Junior TT classification

Clubmans Lightweight TT classification

References

External links
Detailed race results

Isle of Man Tt
Isle of Man Tt
Isle of Man TT
1949